Foxworth may refer to:

Foxworth (surname)

 Domonique Foxworth, retired American football player
 Jaimee Foxworth actress born December 17, 1979 
 Josephine "Jo" Foxworth (3 June 1918 – 2 February 2006) 
 John E. Foxworth, Jr. (1932-1998), philatelist from Michigan 
 Percy E. Foxworth (1906-1943) served as chief of the FBI's Special Intelligence Service
 Robert Heath Foxworth actor born November 1, 1941

Places

 Foxworth, Mississippi

Other